Vamdrup is a town in the Region of Southern Denmark, near Kolding in Denmark with a population of 4,809 (1 January 2022).

History

Three oak coffins were uncovered from graves in the Bronze Age mound Guldhøj in Holt near Vamdrup in 1891, and are now on display at the National Museum (Nationalmuseet).

After the Second War of Schleswig in 1864, where Denmark lost Southern Jutland to Germany until 1920, Vamdrup became a border town, where the railway station had important function as a border railway station. Kolding Sydbaner, a railway company that existed from 1911 to 1948, also had a railway line to Vamdrup.

In connection with the industrialisation in the 1950s and 1960s Vamdrup flourished again with many new companies.

Economy
Danish Air Transport has its head office in the town.

Notable people 
 Johannes Bjerg (1886 in Ødis near Kolding – 1955), Danish sculptor; worked in the El Greco-style
 Lasse Boesen (born 1979 in Vamdrup), retired Danish team handball player

References

External links
 Google Earth view

Cities and towns in the Region of Southern Denmark
Kolding Municipality